Jovan Naumović (Serbian Cyrillic: Јован Наумовић; 11 November 1879 – 13 February 1945) was an Armijski đeneral in the Royal Yugoslav Army who commanded the 3rd Territorial Army during the German-led Axis invasion of Yugoslavia of April 1941 during World War II. Naumović's command consisted of three infantry divisions and some smaller formations. The 3rd Territorial Army was part of the 3rd Army Group which was responsible for the border with Albania between Lake Ohrid to Lake Skadar, and the Romanian and Bulgarian borders between the Iron Gates and the Greek border.

Career
After graduating from the Military Academy in Belgrade, joined the Unification or Death organization. He fought as a Chetnik in Old Serbia against the Ottoman Turks (1904-1905) under the nom de guerre Vojvoda Osogovski.
 
Naumović was chief of staff of the 3rd Army in 1929. After that, he served as a brigade and divisional commander and has head of the gendarmerie. In September 1938 he was appointed to command the 5th Army at Niš.

See also
 List of Chetnik voivodes

Notes

Footnotes

References

Books

Websites
 
 

1879 births
1945 deaths
People from Leskovac
People from the Principality of Serbia
Serbian generals
Royal Yugoslav Army personnel of World War II
Serbian military personnel of World War I
Serbian military personnel of the Balkan Wars
Chetniks of the Macedonian Struggle
People of the Kingdom of Yugoslavia
People from the Kingdom of Serbia
20th-century Serbian people
Royal Serbian Army soldiers